Bad was the first solo concert tour by American singer Michael Jackson, launched in support of his seventh studio album Bad (1987). The 123-show world tour began on September 12, 1987 in Japan, and concluded on January 27, 1989 in the US, and sponsored by soft drink manufacturer Pepsi. It grossed a total of $125 million, making it the second highest-grossing tour of the 1980s after Pink Floyd's Momentary Lapse of Reason tour, and earning two new entries in the Guinness World Records for the largest grossing tour in history and the tour with the largest attended audience. It was nominated for "Tour of the Year 1988" at the inaugural International Rock Awards.

At the end of the Bad tour, Jackson made a public statement that he intended for it to be his last as a touring artist, as he had plans to transition to filmmaking; however, it was followed by the Dangerous World Tour in 1992–1993 and the HIStory World Tour in 1996–1997. Except for two shows in Hawaii during the HIStory Tour, this would be the only time that Jackson would tour the United States as a solo artist.

Background
On June 29, 1987, Jackson's manager Frank DiLeo held a press conference in Tokyo to announce that the 28-year-old Jackson would embark on his first concert tour as a solo artist. It marked his first concerts since the Victory Tour in 1984 which he performed with his brothers as the Jacksons. DiLeo said the tour would start with a Japanese leg because of the country's loyal fans. In a written statement, Jackson, who was completing Bad in Los Angeles, promised "thrilling and exciting" concerts. The soft drink manufacturer Pepsi, with whom Jackson and his brothers had a deal worth an estimated $5 million per year, sponsored the tour. Sales of the drink in Japan doubled during the summer following the announcement, helped by an advertising campaign that offered free tickets and 30,000 souvenirs. The entire entourage were instructed not to be seen drinking a product from rival Coca-Cola in public. Marlon Brando's son Miko joined the tour as a production assistant.

Auditions for the musicians, and subsequent rehearsals, were held at the Leeds facility in North Hollywood. Keyboardist Rory Kaplan, who had played on the Victory Tour, was touring with the Chick Corea Elektric Band when he was asked by Jackson's secretary to join his group as musical director, which Kaplan accepted. The original idea was to bring in former Victory Tour drummer Jonathan Moffett and guitarist David Williams, but the pair were on tour with Madonna. Jackson wanted the music on stage to sound like the albums, and asked Chris Currell, who had played the Synclavier synthesizer and sampler on Bad, to play it live. Currell arranged to have three complete systems: two to handle the music on stage and one for his hotel room for Jackson to record ideas while travelling, plus a dismantled setup for spare parts in case of a problem, and a full time technician. Currell estimated the Synclaviers alone cost $1.4 million. Since he was primarily a guitarist and not a keyboardist, he purchased a SynthAxe MIDI controller guitar to trigger cues to a computer which operated the Synclaviers. The audition performances were filmed and played to Jackson at his home in the evening. The band had just two weeks to rehearse at Leeds before production rehearsals followed at Universal Studios for another three, although no full production in its entirety happened until the first show.

Overview

Japan and Australia (1987)

The tour began with a 14-date leg across Japan, marking Jackson's first performances in the country since 1973 as part of the Jackson 5. Nine shows were originally announced but they sold out within hours, so five more were added due to the high demand. The shows cost the sponsors $8.6 million to stage. Jackson arrived at Tokyo's Narita International Airport on September 9, where over 300 reporters and photographers greeted him upon his arrival. The staging, lighting, and musical equipment for the 1987 dates weighed 110,000 lbs. Jackson assisted in the stage design, which consisted of 700 lights, 100 speakers, 40 lasers, three mirrors, and two 24-by-18 foot screens. Performers wore 70 costumes, four of which were attached with fiber optic lights.

While in Osaka Jackson received the key to the city by the mayor. In Tokyo, Jackson donated $20,000 to the parents of Yoshiaki Hagiwara, a five-year-old boy who was kidnapped and murdered, after he watched a news report about the tragedy. Attendance figures for the first 14 dates in Japan totaled a record-breaking 450,000. Crowds of 200,000 were what past performers could manage to draw for a single tour. Some shows were filmed by Nippon TV and broadcast on Japanese television. Jackson wrapped the Japanese leg by donating several personalised items for a charity auction, including clothes and glasses worn during the tour.

Jackson left Japan for a rest period in Hong Kong and China before the Australian leg. On October 30, a planned New Zealand leg was cancelled as local promoters were unable to meet demands that the audience be seated, although dates there and Australia were also cancelled due to low ticket sales. Between November 13 and 28, Jackson performed five concerts in Melbourne, Sydney, and Brisbane. The loud and enthusiastic crowds were a contrast to the Japanese audience, who were instructed to remain quiet and make little noise, and made it difficult for the group to hear the count-ins at the beginning of a number. During the Brisbane concert, Jackson brought Stevie Wonder on stage to sing "Bad" with him.

North America, Europe, and Japan (1988–1989)
Following the 1987 dates Jackson wanted to revamp the production with a larger stage set-up, the addition of new numbers including "Smooth Criminal" and "Man in the Mirror", and new musical arrangements. Kaplan revisited the studio recordings and prepared tapes for each band member to follow. During this time Phillinganes took over as musical director and Kaplan became technical director. Rehearsals for the new set-up took place at the Pensacola Civic Center in Florida from January 22 to February 18, 1988. Vincent Paterson, who had worked with Jackson on several videos, was brought in to choreograph and co-direct the tour. On the final day, Jackson allowed 420 school pupils to watch him perform a full dress rehearsal after the children made him a rap music video in his honor. The band rehearsed "Speed Demon" from Bad prior to Jackson's arrival two weeks in, and he liked the performance, but it was dropped from the set as he had no choreography to accompany the song. Siegfried and Roy were brought in to advise on some stage illusions.

The first performances were to begin in Atlanta, but Pepsi officials objected the plan as it was home to Coca-Cola. For both Atlanta shows, Jackson gave 100 tickets to the Children's Wish Foundation for terminally ill children to attend. The first of three concerts at Madison Square Garden in New York City in March served as a benefit to raise $500,000 to the United Negro College Fund. Jackson presented a check of $600,000 to the fund.

The European leg began in Rome on May 23, where police and security guards rescued hundreds of fans from being crushed in the crowd of 35,000. Police reported 130 women had fainted at the concert in Vienna. While in Switzerland, Jackson went to Vevey to meet Oona O'Neill, the widow of actor Charlie Chaplin. The most successful of the European dates were those in London at Wembley Stadium, where demand for the five July dates exceeded 1.5 million, enough to fill the 72,000-capacity venue 20 times. Jackson went on to perform seven sold-out shows at Wembley for a total of 504,000 people which entered him into the Guinness World Records, the first of three times from the tour alone. The record surpassed the previous attendance record shared by Madonna, Bruce Springsteen, and Genesis. More shows could have been added, but the venue had reached its quota for live performances. The third concert was attended by Diana, Princess of Wales and Prince Charles, and subsequently released as Live at Wembley July 16, 1988. On July 30, NBC aired Michael Jackson Around the World, a 90-minute special documenting the singer on tour. On August 29, after a birthday performance in Leeds, Jackson donated $130,000 to Give for Life. The final European show was held in Liverpool at Aintree Racecourse, where 1,550 fans were reported injured among the crowd of 125,000, the largest show of the tour.

Jackson toured the United States for a second time between September 1988 and January 1989, with a return to Tokyo for nine shows in December which included a concert on Christmas Day. This would be the last time he toured his native country, aside from two shows in Hawaii in 1997 and a handful of one-off appearances in 2001 and 2002. On October 23, 1988, he donated $125,000, the net proceeds of the first show in Auburn Hills, to the city's Motown Museum. The tour was planned to end in Tokyo, but Jackson suffered from swollen vocal cords after the first of six concerts in Los Angeles in November, and the remaining five were rescheduled for January 1989. Due to this rescheduling, Phillinganes had to disembark from the tour in early January, having already made commitments to tour with Eric Clapton. Studio musician John Barnes was hired to take Phillinganes' place.

During the run of shows in Tokyo, nine-year-old Ayana Takada was selected to receive a certificate by Jackson to commemorate the four millionth person to attend the tour.

Five performances in Los Angeles were held to conclude the tour on January 27, 1989. Currell remembered a minor earthquake shook the stage as the band were taking their final bow at the end of the final show. Guinness World Records recognized the tour as the largest grossing in history and the tour to play to the most people ever. In April 1989, the tour was nominated for "Tour of the Year 1988" at the inaugural International Rock Awards. It lost to Amnesty International.

Concert film and other recordings
A live album and DVD of the July 16, 1988, concert in London titled Live at Wembley July 16, 1988 was released along with the special edition reissue of the Bad album titled Bad 25 on September 18, 2012, as well as a stand-alone DVD. Video of the September 26, 1987, Concert in Yokohama, Japan, was broadcast on Nippon Television and is available on YouTube. A number of amateur-shot concerts and short snippets were leaked on YouTube a few years later. Half-show footage of Rome (May 23, 1988) and Brisbane (November 28, 1987), and a high-quality 30-minute segment of live footage of Tokyo (December 9, 1988), as well as full low-quality leaks of Tokyo (September 12 & 13, 1987) and Osaka (October 10, 1987) are also available online. Audio recordings of the final Los Angeles (January 27, 1989) concert have been crowdfunded and released on YouTube. Audio recordings from the rehearsal at Pensacola, Florida (February 18, 1988) have also been released as well. Atlanta (April 13, 1988), Auburn Hills (October 24, 1988), Osaka (October 12, 1987), Tokyo (September 13, 1987),  have been leaked.

Opening acts
 Kim Wilde (Europe)
 Taylor Dayne (Europe - August 5–23, 1988)

Setlist

Tour dates

Cancelled dates

Known preparation dates

Personnel

Band 
 Michael Jackson – co-director, co-choreographer, lead vocals, dancing
 Greg Phillinganes – musical director, keyboards
 Rory Kaplan – keyboards
 Christopher Currell – Synclavier synthesizers, digital guitar, sound effects
 Ricky Lawson – drums, percussion
 Jennifer Batten – rhythm and lead guitar
 Jon Clark – lead and rhythm guitar
 Don Boyette – bass guitar, synth bass
 John Barnes – keyboards (1989 shows only)
 Darryl Phinnessee – vocal music director, backing vocals
 Dorian Holley – backing vbcals
 Sheryl Crow – backing vocals
 Kevin Dorsey – backing vocals

Dancers 
 Randy Allaire
 Evaldo Garcia
 Dominic Lucero
 LaVelle Smith Jr.
 Tatiana Thumbzten (Kansas City and first New York City show only)
 Keith "DJ Proper" Jordan (1989 shows only)

Wardrobe and crew
 Karen Faye – hair and makeup
 Tommy Simms – stylist
 Bill Frank Whitten – costume design
 Dennis Tompkins – costume design
 Michael Bush – costume design
 Jolie Levine – Jackson's personal assistant
 Meredith Besser – assistant

Production and management 
 Jaun C. Marin – assistant director
 Vincent Paterson – co-director, choreographer
 Tom McPhillips –set designer
 Allen Branton –lighting designer
 Frank DiLeo – Jackson's manager
 Sal Bonafede – tour co-ordinator
 John Draper – tour manager
 Benny Collins – production manager
 Nelson Hayes – production co-ordinator
 Rob Henry – production co-ordinator
 Gerry Bakalian – stage manager
 Tait Towers, Inc. – set construction
 Clair Bros. – sound
 Kevin Elison – house sound engineer
 Rick Coberly – monitor engineer
 Ziffren, Brittenham and Branca – attorneys
 Gelfand, Rennert and Feldman – business management
 Solters/Roskin, Friedman Inc. – public relations
 Bob Jones – VP of communications
 Glen Brunman – media relations
 Michael Mitchell – tour publicist
 Gretta Walsh of Revel Travel – travel agent
 Patrick "Bubba" Morrow – Nocturne Video
 Mo Morrison – production team

See also

 List of highest-grossing concert tours

Notes

References

Citations

Sources
 
 

Michael Jackson concert tours
1987 concert tours
1988 concert tours
1989 concert tours
Concert tours of North America
Concert tours of the United States
Concert tours of Europe
Concert tours of the United Kingdom
Concert tours of France
Concert tours of Germany
Concert tours of Ireland
Concert tours of Oceania
Concert tours of Australia
Concert tours of Asia
Concert tours of Japan